The Ivory Coast women's national basketball team is the national team representing Ivory Coast in basketball competitions for women. It is administered by the Fédération Ivoirienne de Basket-Ball.

African Championship record
1977 – 4th
1981 – 5th
1983 – 5th
1990 – 6th
1993 – 5th
1994 – 5th
2000 – 8th
2007 – 8th
2009 – 4th
2011 – 8th
2013 – 7th
2017 – 5th
2019 – 8th
2021 – 7th

Current roster
Roster for the 2021 Women's Afrobasket.

See also
Ivory Coast women's national under-19 basketball team
Ivory Coast women's national under-17 basketball team
Ivory Coast women's national 3x3 team

References

External links
FIBA profile
Ivory Coast Basketball Records at FIBA Archive

 
Women's national basketball teams